Arene brasiliana is a species of sea snail, a marine gastropod mollusk in the family Areneidae.

Description

The shell can grow to be 7 mm in length.

Distribution
Arene brasiliana can be found from Panama to North Brazil.

References

External links
 To Biodiversity Heritage Library (3 publications)
 To Encyclopedia of Life
 To ITIS
 To World Register of Marine Species

Areneidae
Gastropods described in 1927